The Zirid expedition to Barghawata occurred in 979 and was conducted by the army of Buluggin ibn Ziri to punish Barghawata's sovereign.

Buluggin ibn Ziri had just conquered most of Morocco and then directed his military campaign towards Tamasna, the stronghold of the Barghawata confederacy.

He emerged victorious from his campaign, successfully enslaving a large number of inhabitants and sending them to Ifriqiya. When his lieutenant paraded the slaves in the streets, the people were shocked, as they had never witnessed such a large number of slaves before.

See also
Zirid conquest of Morocco

References 

Military expeditions
10th century in Morocco
Zirid dynasty